Mowruzeh (also Romanized as Mowrūzeh; also known as Mowrūz and Nowrūzeh) is a village in Shesh Pir Rural District, Hamaijan District, Sepidan County, Fars Province, Iran. At the 2006 census, its population was 184, in 47 families.

References 

Populated places in Sepidan County